Winnie-the-Pooh: Exploring a Classic was an exhibition on the history of the Winnie-the-Pooh books.

The exhibit includes pages from A. A. Milne and E. H. Shepard's works, a diary from Harry Colebourn, as well as Pooh merchandise. The exhibition has recreations of Christopher Robin's bed and other settings from the Winnie-the-Pooh books.

The tour started at the Victoria and Albert Museum in London and finish at the Royal Ontario Museum in Toronto, Canada.

In Toronto, the exhibit was originally planned to run from 7 March 2020 to 3 August 2020  but was forced to down after 7 days due to the COVID-19 pandemic. It was located inside the Roloff Beny Gallery within the Michael Lee-Chin Crystal. The exhibit reopened on September 1, 2020, with a planned closure of January 17, 2021. It was forced to close again on November 22, 2020, after 83 days.

Venues

References 

Winnie-the-Pooh
Museum events
December 2017 events in the United Kingdom